The Patel Nagar Metro Station is located on the Blue Line of the Delhi Metro. It connects to east, west, and south Patel Nagar with the rest of Delhi.

The station

Station layout

Facilities
List of available ATM at Patel Nagar metro station are Oriental Bank of Commerce, Karnataka Bank, Canara Bank, IndusInd Bank

Entry/exit

Connections

Bus
Delhi Transport Corporation bus routes number 47A, 47ACL, 73, 85, 85EXT, 85Ext, 114+990, 114+990E, 160, 208, 218, 308,313, 408, 408CL, 408EXTCL, 410, 410CL, 521,  522A, 751, 753, 775A, 803, 803CL, 807A, 810, 838, 842, 857, 871, 871A, 894, 894CL, 910, 910A, 940, 943, 944, 944EXTSPL, 953, 962, 962A, 970, 970A, 970B, 970C, 975, 980, 985, 990, 990A, 990CL, 990ECL, 990EXT, 991, 997, New Delhi Railway Station Gate 2 - Bahadurgarh Bus Stand serves the station from outside metro station stop.

See also

Delhi
Patel Nagar
List of Delhi Metro stations
Transport in Delhi
Delhi Metro Rail Corporation
Delhi Suburban Railway
Delhi Monorail
Delhi Transport Corporation
Central Delhi
New Delhi
National Capital Region (India)
List of rapid transit systems
List of metro systems

References

External links

 Delhi Metro Rail Corporation Ltd. (Official site) 
 Delhi Metro Annual Reports
 
 UrbanRail.Net – Descriptions of all metro systems in the world, each with a schematic map showing all stations.

Delhi Metro stations
Railway stations opened in 2005
Railway stations in Central Delhi district